Ovie Scurlock (November 11, 1918 – June 14, 2016) was an American jockey in Thoroughbred horse racing.

Born in Paintsville, Kentucky, Scurlock began his professional riding career in 1938 at Fairmount Park Racetrack in Collinsville, Illinois. A year later, on August 26, 1939, at Ellis Park Racecourse in Henderson, Kentucky, he rode a three-year-old colt, Mr. Ambassador, to a world record time of 1:39 2/5 for a mile and 40 yards.

His career was interrupted during World War II when he served his country in the U.S. Coast Guard during World War II.

During his career, Scurlock rode for prominent owners such as George D. Widener, Jr., Harry Guggenheim, Ada L. Rice, and Herbert M. Woolf. He was also a regular rider during the early 1950s for the Brandywine Stable of Donald P. Ross as well as one of the riders for Calumet Farm.

On June 11, 1949, he rode Coaltown, Calumet's Handicap Horse of the Year of 1949, to victory in the Roger Williams Handicap at Narragansett Park.

Scurlock won a number of important races of his era, such as the Lawrence Realization Stakes in New York, the Arlington Classic in Chicago, and the Pimlico Special in Baltimore. He competed in the Kentucky Derby three times and the Preakness Stakes once with his best result a seventh in both races in 1949 aboard Model Cadet.

When his riding days were over, Scurlock worked as an assistant trainer for Warren A. Croll, Jr.

Ovie Scurlock died June 14, 2016, at St. Mary's Medical Center in Evansville, Indiana, USA.

References

1918 births
2016 deaths
American jockeys
People from Paintsville, Kentucky
United States Coast Guard personnel of World War II